The 1970 Singapore Open, also known as the 1970 Singapore Open Badminton Championships, took place from 15 to 18 October 1970 at the Singapore Badminton Hall in Singapore.

Venue
Singapore Badminton Hall

Final results

References 

Singapore Open (badminton)
1970 in badminton
1970 in Singaporean sport